Taractrocera maevius, the common grass dart, is a butterfly belonging to the family Hesperiidae found in India, Sri Lanka and Myanmar.

Description

Field characteristics
The common grass dart is similar in size and markings to the Tamil grass dart Taractrocera ceramas Hewitson, but the spots on the forewings is white. It shares its habits and habitat with the Tamil grass dart. However, it is also found away from the hills and is widespread in the plains of Indian peninsula. In flight, it can resemble the grass blues (Zizeeria spp.).

Status, distribution and habitat
It is one of the most common of the skippers in the grasslands of the Western Ghats and occurs from low elevations up to montane grasslands. It is also found in grassy clearings in the forests and in rice fields. It occurs in the monsoon and immediate post-monsoon months when the vegetation is green, but occasional specimens may appear in other seasons as well.

The caterpillars feed on various species of grasses, including rice, Oryza sativa.

References

Taractrocerini
Butterflies of Asia
Butterflies of Indochina
Butterflies described in 1793